Brian D. Miller is an American attorney who serves as the Special Inspector General for Pandemic Recovery (SIGPR). In this role, Miller oversees the United States Department of the Treasury's implementation of the Coronavirus Aid, Relief, and Economic Security Act.

Early life and education
A native of Virginia, Miller received his Bachelor of Arts degree from Temple University, Juris Doctor from the University of Texas School of Law, and Master of Arts from Westminster Theological Seminary.

Career
Miller was formally nominated as SIGPR by the Trump administration on 6 April 2020, a move that the Trump administration had signaled several days earlier, which had prompted Montana Senator Jon Tester and Utah Senator Mitt Romney to draft a letter to the president requesting a different, independent Special Inspector General. The U.S. Senate Banking Committee held his confirmation hearing on May 5 and voted on May 12 to advance his nomination to the full Senate. The Senate confirmed him on June 2.

References

Living people
People from Virginia
Assistant United States Attorneys
United States Department of the Treasury officials
George W. Bush administration personnel
Obama administration personnel
Trump administration personnel
Biden administration personnel
COVID-19 pandemic in the United States
Temple University alumni
University of Texas School of Law alumni
Westminster Theological Seminary alumni
21st-century American lawyers
Place of birth missing (living people)
Date of birth missing (living people)
Year of birth missing (living people)